Sándor Plósz (10 June 1846 - 29 May 1925) was a Hungarian politician and jurist, who served as Minister of Justice between 1899 and 1905. He was a member of the Hungarian Academy of Sciences. He became representative of the House of Magnates in 1914.

References
 Magyar Életrajzi Lexikon

1846 births
1925 deaths
Justice ministers of Hungary